The A593 is a road in Cumbria, England, running north east from the A595 road at Broughton-in-Furness through Torver, Coniston and Skelwith Bridge to Ambleside at the north end of Windermere.

References

Roads in Cumbria
Scenic routes in the United Kingdom